Airport Junction Shopping Centre (also known as Airport Junction Mall) is a shopping centre in at the Airport Road and A1 in Gaborone, Botswana opened in April 2012.

The centre consists of four separate buildings. Anchors at the centre's launch included Shoprite supermarket, Edgars (department store), Builders Warehouse (in an outbuilding) and (closed in 2017) Stuttafords department store. Virgin Active fitness centre opened its first Botswana branch in 2015, Dischem, a large chemists (pharmacy) did the same in 2018, and Cotton On opened in 2019.

External links
Official website

References

Shopping malls in Botswana